Ketna Patel (born 1968) is a British-Indian pop artist.

Early life and education 
Patel was born in Uganda. She received her education in the United Kingdom, where she studied Design and Architecture.

Career 
Some of Patel's clients include IIFA (International Indian Film Academy) and director Spike Lee. She has licensed her artwork for many applications; the last being an ongoing contract with the Austrian furniture maker ADA to make bed headboards inspired by European history. Her Asia Pop collection, a series celebrating popular Asian street culture by giving a voice to the invisible and marginalized, was used as inspiration for fashion label AllDressedUp's Spring/Summer 2010 collection, which was shown in 25 countries. 

Ketna's studio in Singapore became an experiment in communal living and an organic artist collective. 

In 2011, Tata Motors commissioned her to convert one of their Nano cars into a work of art, which she did using Italian glass mosaic by SICIS. In 2012, she painted a giant fibreglass elephant for the Elephant Parade and was a brand ambassador for Kiehl's to raise money for autism.  In April 2015, she was invited by Singapore's AWARE and WOAM (Women on a Mission) to stage a solo exhibition to raise money for the Nepal earthquake.  

Recently, the Salsali Private Museum in Dubai acquired and exhibited her piece "Asian Grandfathers." Aside from being commissioned by several hotels and restaurants in Singapore and the UK, Patel has participated in talks, workshops and exhibitions worldwide.

Alongside her studio work, from 2013-2018, Ketna organized and participated in ‘Rural – Urban’ divide village projects in India and the UK to continue investigating the ramifications of globalization on identity, populism and nationhood.

In 2018, she was presented with the UK-India Youth leader award, and consequently selected to be part of the steering committee for the Commonwealth Business Women’s network (both headquartered in London). Ketna is also a member of the non profit Thinktank organization, Bridge India.

Ketna had been featured in Bridget Tracy Tan's 'Women Artists of Singapore,' Jane Leong's 'Contemporary Artists in Singapore' and Tatjana Schantz Johnsson's 'Decorating Asia.'

Personal life 
Ketna is married to Jonathan.

Awards 

 2002: ASEAN Art Award 
 2018: UK-India Youth Leader Award

References

External links
 Official website

1968 births
Living people
21st-century women artists
Gujarati people
Singaporean people of Ugandan descent
Singaporean Hindus